Oake is a village and civil parish in Somerset, England, situated  west of Taunton in the Somerset West and Taunton district.  The village has a population of 765.

The parish includes the  hamlet of Hillfarrance on Hillfarrance Brook a tributary of the River Tone, and the villages of Hillcommon and Heathfield.

The Sustrans cycle route 3 from Bristol to Padstow passes through the village, as does the route of the Grand Western Canal.

History

The village was named Acon in 897 based on the early presence of Oak trees. From Saxon times it formed part of the manor of Taunton Deane which belonged to the Bishop of Winchester.

The parishes of Heathfield and Hillfarrance were part of the Taunton Deane Hundred.

Governance

The parish council has responsibility for local issues, including setting an annual precept (local rate) to cover the council’s operating costs and producing annual accounts for public scrutiny. The parish council evaluates local planning applications and works with the local police, district council officers, and neighbourhood watch groups on matters of crime, security, and traffic. The parish council's role also includes initiating projects for the maintenance and repair of parish facilities, as well as consulting with the district council on the maintenance, repair, and improvement of highways, drainage, footpaths, public transport, and street cleaning. Conservation matters (including trees and listed buildings) and environmental issues are also the responsibility of the council.

The village falls within the non-metropolitan district of Somerset West and Taunton, which was established on 1 April 2019. It was previously in the district of Taunton Deane, which was formed on 1 April 1974 under the Local Government Act 1972, and part of Wellington Rural District before that. The district council is responsible for local planning and building control, local roads, council housing, environmental health, markets and fairs, refuse collection and recycling, cemeteries and crematoria, leisure services, parks, and tourism.

Somerset County Council is responsible for running the largest and most expensive local services such as education, social services, libraries, main roads, public transport, policing and  fire services, trading standards, waste disposal and strategic planning.

It is also part of the Taunton Deane county constituency represented in the House of Commons of the Parliament of the United Kingdom. It elects one Member of Parliament (MP) by the first past the post system of election.

Geography

Between Oake and Bradford-on-Tone is Lang's Farm, a biological Site of Special Scientific Interest which provides an example of unimproved, herb-rich neutral grassland of a type now rare in Britain.

Religious sites

The Church of the Holy Cross in Hillfarrance dates from the 14th century, with the tower being added in 1540, and has been designated by English Heritage as a Grade II* listed building.

In Oake village the Church of St Bartholomew dates from the 13th century, whereas the Church of St John the Baptist in Heathfield retains its 13th century tower but the rest of the church was largely rebuilt in 1841.

Hillcommon had a Methodist chapel which was built in 1846 but fell into disuse. It has now been converted into residential accommodation.

References

External links

  Hillfarrance Community website

Villages in Taunton Deane
Civil parishes in Somerset
Grand Western Canal